In Jainism, a tīrtha ( "ford, a shallow part of a body of water that may be easily crossed") is used to refer both to  pilgrimage sites as well as to the four sections of the sangha. A tirtha provides the inspiration to enable one to cross over from worldly engagement to the side of moksha.

Jain tirthas are located throughout India. Often a tirtha has a number of temples as well as residences (dharmashala) for the pilgrims and wandering monks and scholars.

Types
Tirtha sites include:

 Siddhakshetras or site of moksha liberation of an arihant (kevalin) or Tirthankaras like Ashtapada Hill, Shikharji, Girnar, Pawapuri, Palitana, Mangi-Tungi and Champapuri (capital of Anga)
 Atishayakshetras where divine events have occurred like Mahavirji, Rishabhdeo, Kundalpur, Aharji etc.
 Puranakshetras associated with lives of great men like Ayodhya, Vidisha, Hastinapur, and Rajgir
 Gyanakshetra: associated with famous acharyas or centers of learning like Mohankheda, Shravanabelagola and Ladnu

Locations
Geographically, the tirthas are divided into six quarters:
 North India: Hastinapur, Taxila, and Ashtapada
 South India: Shravanabelagola, Sankighatta, Moodabidri, Humbaj, Anantnath Swami Temple, Gummileru
 Eastern India: Shikharji, Pawapuri, Champapuri, Pundravardhana
 Western India: Palitana, Girnar, Mount Abu, Mahavirji, Shankheshwar, Mahudi
 Central India: Vidisha, Kundalpur, Sonagiri, Muktagiri
 Overseas: Siddhachalam, Nava Ashtapada, Siddhayatan

See also

 Jain temple
 Tirtha (Hinduism)
 Vividha Tirtha Kalpa

References

External links
 jainuniversity.org, Jain Tirtha all over India
 http://www.jainteerth.com
 http://tirth.jinvani.com
 http://www.jainpilgrimages.com
 http://www.jaintirths.com
 http://www.siddhayatan.org First Hindu-Jain Tirth in North America
 http://www.jainheritagecentres.com
 Shri Nageshwar Parshwanath
 Jain Tirth Darshan on jainreligion.in

 
Jain pilgrimage sites
Pilgrimage in India